Kira Simon-Kennedy is a documentary film producer. She was nominated for an Academy Award in the category Best Documentary Feature for the film Ascension.

Selected filmography 
 Ascension (2021; co-nominated with Jessica Kingdon and Nathan Truesdell)

References

External links 

Living people
Place of birth missing (living people)
Year of birth missing (living people)
American documentary film producers